The black-collared apalis (Oreolais pulcher) is a species of bird in the family Cisticolidae.
It is found in the Cameroonian Highlands forests, western Kenya and the Albertine rift montane forests.

The black-collared apalis was formerly placed in the genus Apalis but was moved to the new genus Oreolais when Apalis was shown to be polyphyletic.

References

black-collared apalis
Birds of Central Africa
Fauna of Kenya
black-collared apalis
Taxonomy articles created by Polbot